Vicharn Minchainant (born July 24, 1960) is a Thai politician. He is a former Deputy Minister of Ministry of Public Health, a Bangkok Member of Parliament, deputy leader of Pheu Thai Party and leader of Pheu Thai Bangkok MPs.

Background and education 
Vicharn was born at Min Buri, Bangkok, to Mr. Paitune and Mrs. Supatra Minchainant. He is a nephew of Dr. Suthee Minchaiynunt, a billionaire, landowner, philanthropist, and the Honourable President for Life of Thai-Chinese Chamber of Commerce. Vicharn married Jintana Minchainant and have 4 children.

One of Vicharn's brothers, Wirat Minchainant (Thai: วิรัตน์ มีนชัยนันท์), was a three-time Member of the Bangkok Metropolitan Council.

Vicharn holds a Master of Arts degree (Political Science in Public Administration) from Thammasat University.

Political career 
Vicharn began his political career with Democrat Party. At the age of 25, Vicharn became a member and a chairman of Min Buri District Council. He was voted as a member of the Bangkok Metropolitan Council for two times in 1994 and 1998, and served as the 1st Vice-Chairman of the Bangkok Metropolitan Council.

Vicharn joined Thai Rak Thai Party in 2000 and became a Bangkok Member of Parliament, representing Min Buri and Khlong Sam Wa Districts. Since then, he has won all national elections in 2001, 2005, 2006 (void), 2007, and 2011. He is one of a very few  Bangkok MPs who has won the elections more than 4 times in a row.

In 2008, Vicharn was appointed as the Deputy Minister of Public Health in two cabinets; under Prime Minister Samak Sundaravej and Prime Minister Somchai Wongsawat. He served as Acting Minister of Public Health after the Constitutional Court ordered Health Minister Chaiya Sasomsub to quit.

Political position 
2011: Bangkok Member of Parliament, Pheu Thai Party (term 4)
2010: Deputy leader of Pheu Thai Party (resigned 2011)
2008: Deputy Minister of Public Health under Prime Minister Somchai Wongsawat
2008: Deputy Minister of Public Health under Prime Minister Samak Sundaravej
2007: Bangkok Member of Parliament, People's Power Party (term 3)
2006: Bangkok Member of Parliament, Thai Rak Thai Party (void)
2005: Chairman of the Committee on Consumer Protection
2004: Assistant Secretary to the Minister of Education
2001: Bangkok Member of Parliament, Thai Rak Thai Party (term 2)
2001: Vice Chairman of the Committee on Budget Administration Follow-up of the House of Parliament
2001: Bangkok Member of Parliament, Thai Rak Thai Party (term 1)
1998: 1st Vice-Chairman of the Bangkok Metropolitan Council 
1998: Member of the Bangkok Metropolitan Council, Min Buri District (term 2) 
1994: Member of the Bangkok Metropolitan Council, Min Buri District (term 1)
1985: Chairman of Min Buri District Council 
1985: Member of Min Buri District Council (2 terms)

Thai Royal decorations 
Vicharn has received the following royal decorations in the Honours System of Thailand:
 2007 –  Knight Grand Cordon (Special Class) of the Most Exalted Order of the White Elephant
 2005 –  Knight Grand Cordon (Special Class) of The Most Noble Order of the Crown of Thailand
 2004 –  Knight Grand Cross (First Class) of the Most Exalted Order of the White Elephant
 2003 –  Knight Grand Cross (First Class) of the Most Noble Order of the Crown of Thailand
 2001 –  Knight Commander (Second Class) of the Most Exalted Order of the White Elephant
 1998 –  Commander (Third Class) of The Most Noble Order of the Crown of Thailand

See also 
 Pheu Thai Party
 Health in Thailand

References

External links 
 คณะรัฐมนตรีไทย คณะที่ 57 Samak cabinet: 57th Council of Ministers
 คณะรัฐมนตรีไทย คณะที่ 58 Somchai cabinet: 58th Council of Ministers
  Royal Thai Government Gazette
  http://politicalbase.in.th
  Thai Parliament Portal
  Cabinet 2008
 

1960 births
Vicharn Minchainant
Living people
Vicharn Minchainant
Vicharn Minchainant
Vicharn Minchainant
Vicharn Minchaiynunt
Vicharn Minchainant
Vicharn Minchainant
Vicharn Minchainant
Vicharn Minchainant